Beautiful Boy is a 2010 drama film starring Michael Sheen and Maria Bello. It premiered at the San Sebastián International Film Festival in September 2010 and was given a limited release in North American theaters on June 3, 2011.

Plot
The film opens up with home videos of a husband and wife at the beach with their young son. A young man reads a short story to a small group about a boy and girl; saying that they didn't know it, but their lives would one day irrevocably change. But he finds that none of the group are paying attention to him. Bill and Kate are a married couple who are tightly wound and devoted to their work. Bill is a businessman, and Kate proofreads books for a living. The only thing keeping them together is their eighteen-year-old son Sam, who is having trouble adjusting to college.

One morning, it is reported on the news that there has been a shooting spree at Sam's school. They are then visited by the police who inform them that Sam is not only dead, but that he was the gunman. Kate refuses to believe that their son would do something so horrible, and spends the night tidying up Sam's room which had been searched by the police. As the news media descends upon the couple the following day, Bill and Kate decide to stay with Kate's brother Eric and his wife Trish. The next morning, Eric and Trish's son Dylan turns on the television to see a video made by Sam about the impending massacre. Bill then decides to issue a public statement, saying that they are both deeply sorry over what has happened, and ask for their privacy as they endeavor to get their lives back on track. They have a small funeral with only family present.

Trish soon becomes agitated at Kate's nit-picking, and her attempts to mother Dylan, but Eric says that she has to be sensitive to their situation since Sam was her only child. They eventually leave, saying they are going to visit a friend, but check into a motel instead. The manager not knowing who they are, makes a comment about Sam and his "monster family". Bill and Kate spend the night together seeming to rekindle their romantic feelings. Then Bill goes back to the house where he finds a teenage boy in Sam's room going through his belongings. They have a short scuffle where Bill cuts his hand, and the boy calls him a "psycho". He returns to the motel with their laptop, and finds a video from Sam. He and Kate view it together; Sam only says "mom and dad , I'm sorry, please don't hate me".

Bill and Kate get into an argument about what could have caused Sam to kill all those innocent people. Bill lashes out at Kate for always critiquing every decision that Sam ever made, but she says that he was never there for them because he was always so busy working. Bill ends up yelling that he wishes that Sam was never born, and Kate leaves.

Kate goes back to their house for the first time since the shooting, and looks through Sam's room. Bill meets with his boss Harry, who reluctantly agrees that he can return to work next week. While grocery shopping, Kate runs into her young co-worker Cooper. They go back to the house, after sharing a sad memory he excuses himself for the bathroom. Kate then discovers Cooper is actually researching Sam when she finds Cooper's notebook. She catches him in Sam's room looking through Sam's stories. He explains that he is writing a piece about the shooting, but that he wanted to portray Sam in a more human light by learning more about him. Saddened, Kate asks him to leave. Bill finally returns to work, but feels alienated by the rest of the staff who keep staring at him. After Bill furiously demands what their problem is, Harry tells Bill to take more time off to see a therapist, so he quits.

Bill later visits the cemetery to find Sam's gravestone vandalized, with the word killer written on it. He breaks down both physically and emotionally as he tries to scrub the word off with his bandaged hand. Kate reads all of Sam's stories, and goes to Sam's gravestone as well. She gets a call from the motel manager about Bill, and finds him curled up and depressed in their old room. Kate embraces the emotionally distraught Bill, and takes him home.

Sam's voice is heard again as he ends his short story about the boy and girl. He says that no matter what they do, their lives will never be the same.

Cast

Michael Sheen as Bill Carroll
Maria Bello as Kate Carroll
Alan Tudyk as Eric
Moon Bloodgood as Trish
Kyle Gallner as Sam Carroll
Logan South as young Sam Carroll
Meat Loaf as the motel manager
Bruce French as Harry
Austin Nichols as Cooper
Gregory Alpert as Baby Shower Carl, Web Reporter Voice
Deidrie Henry as Bonnie
Kelli Kirkland as TV News Reporter (as Kelli Kirkland Powers)
David Lipper as Radio Reporter Voice, Television Ranter
Nigel Gibbs as Detective
Brooke Lyons as TV Reporter Voice
Michael Call as TV Reporter Voice
Cody Wai-Ho Lee as Dylan
Jessie Usher as Basketball Teen
Darren O'Hare as Church Pastor
Myra Turley as Grieving Mother Patty

Production
Filmmaker Shawn Ku first conceived of the film as being about a married couple in a strained relationship, but decided to add in the school shooting element and focus on the parents of the perpetrator as that particular  scenario had not been depicted on screen before. Of his preparations for the script, Ku said, "So often the parents in a situation like this just completely disappear from the discussion. They’re forced into hiding. So it’s hard to do research about what it’s like to go through such a horrific tragedy. You don’t even have a home to hide in. So [co-writer Michael Armbruster and I] just wanted to shed some light, our light on these two people who’ve been both ignored within and blamed for these terrible tragedies."

Critical reception 
The performances of Bello and Sheen were roundly praised, but critics found fault with the storytelling. Stephen Holden of The New York Times wrote the film is "so high-mindedly determined to avoid sensationalism that it sidesteps critical dramatic content and sabotages its own ambitions". Ann Hornaday of The Washington Post commented, "As accomplished as Bello and Sheen are in underplaying their characters’ extreme emotions, Beautiful Boy begins to feel less like a taut character study and more like a maudlin melodrama. Its weaknesses are only heightened by inevitable comparisons with recent, much better movies that touched on the similar themes, especially last year’s Blue Valentine and Rabbit Hole."

Critic Roger Ebert awarded the film 3 out of 4 stars. He wrote, "A film like this can end honestly in only one way, and Ku is true to it. Life will go on, one baffling day after another. There can be no release, only a gradual deadening. So it must be with most parents of children who commit horrible deeds. People do things for which there are no reasons, and if they don't kill themselves, they must live…in the debris of their madness."

On review aggregate website Rotten Tomatoes, Beautiful Boy has an approval rating of 71% based on 68 reviews.

Accolades 
At the 2010 Toronto International Film Festival, the film won the Prize of the International Critics (FIPRESCI) for the Discovery program.

References

External links
  (Archived from the original)
 
 
 

2010 films
2010 independent films
2010 drama films
American drama films
Films about school violence
Films shot in Los Angeles
Films shot in California
Films directed by Shawn Ku
2010s English-language films
2010s American films